The Andhra Pradesh Tourism Development Corporation (APTDC) is a state government agency which promotes tourism in Andhra Pradesh, India.

The department offers tour packages of Heritage, Nature, Adventure, Health and Rural tourism representing rich historical and natural background of Andhra Pradesh state. The tours covering 8 centers of Andhra Pradesh. The department maintains resorts at popular tourism destinations such as Tirupati, Horseley hills, Araku valley, Vizag and Srisailam.  A wide range of vehicles including 63 hi-tech coaches, 29 Volvo coaches, 8 air-conditioned hi-tech coaches, 4 semi-sleepers, 11 mini vehicles, 1 vintage coach and 10 Qualis are being used.

APTDC is also promoting leisure tourism in the state of Andhra Pradesh. It has identified a number of potential tourism developments. In 2006, it opened an office to serve the Tamil Nadu market.

Destination Andhra Pradesh 

AP is 3rd highest in India in terms of number of visits by tourists to Indian states. In 2013, 152.1 million domestic tourists visited Andhra Pradesh which was about 13.3% of the total domestic tourism market. There are Scenic locations, Beaches, Reservoirs and Pristine Forest areas in the state. 100% exemption of luxury tax for all new tourism infrastructure projects that meets certain minimum requirements is provided by Authorities.

See also
 Tourism in Andhra Pradesh
 Tourism in Telangana
 Tourism in Karnataka
  Tourism in Kerala
 Tourism in Maharashtra
 Tourism in Tamil Nadu
 Tourism in India

References

External links
  Official site

Tourism in Andhra Pradesh
State agencies of Andhra Pradesh
State tourism development corporations of India
Organisations based in Vijayawada
Government agencies with year of establishment missing